John Erik Fornæss (born 14 October 1946, Hamar, Norway) is a Norwegian-American mathematician.
Fornæss received his master's degree in 1970 from the University of Oslo with thesis Uniform approximation on manifolds and his PhD in 1974 from the University of Washington under Edgar Lee Stout with thesis Embedding Strictly Pseudoconvex Domains in Convex Domains. At Princeton University he became in 1974 an instructor, in 1976 an assistant professor, in 1978 an associate professor, and in 1981 a full professor. Since 1991 he has been a professor at the University of Michigan.

He does research on the theory of functions of several complex variables with emphasis on their geometry and dynamics. With Nessim Sibony he constructed a Fatou-Julia theory in two complex variables. He is also known for constructing a counterexample in several complex variables in 1976.

Fornæss is a fellow of the Norwegian Academy of Science and Letters. In 2015 he was elected a Fellow of the American Mathematical Society. Fornæss has an Erdős number of 2.

 Selected publications 
Articles
with Klas Diederich: 
with Klas Diederich: 

Books
 with Berit Stensønes: Lectures on counterexamples in several complex variables, Mathematical Notes 33, Princeton University Press, 1987; 2nd edition 2007
 as editor: Dynamics of several complex variables, American Mathematical Society 1996
 as editor: Recent developments in several complex variables, Princeton University Press 1981
 as editor: Several complex variables'' (Proceedings Mittag-Leffler Institut 1987/88), Princeton University Press 1993

References

External links 
 Homepage

1946 births
Living people
20th-century Norwegian mathematicians
21st-century American  mathematicians
University of Oslo alumni
Princeton University faculty
University of Michigan faculty
Members of the Norwegian Academy of Science and Letters
Fellows of the American Mathematical Society